Labor geography is a sub-discipline of human geography and economic geography that deals with the spatial relationships and geographic trends within labor and political systems.

See also
 Labor market area

Further reading

Human geography
Economic geography
Geography